Old Fig Garden (formerly, Fig Garden) is a census-designated place in Fresno County, California. It lies at an elevation of 312 feet (95 m). The city of Fresno, through annexations, has entirely circled Fig Garden. Old Fig Garden's population was 5,365 at the 2010 census.

Demographics
At the 2010 census Old Fig Garden had a population of 5,365. The racial makeup of Old Fig Garden was 4,000 (74.6%) White, 105 (2.0%) African American, 54 (1.0%) Native American, 209 (3.9%) Asian, 10 (0.2%) Pacific Islander, 733 (13.7%) from other races, and 254 (4.7%) from two or more races. Hispanic or Latino of any race were 1,532 persons (28.6%).

The census reported that 5,337 people (99.5% of the population) lived in households, 28 (0.5%) lived in non-institutionalized group quarters, and no one was institutionalized.

There were 2,121 households, 602 (28.4%) had children under the age of 18 living in them, 1,052 (49.6%) were opposite-sex married couples living together, 229 (10.8%) had a female householder with no husband present, 108 (5.1%) had a male householder with no wife present.  There were 104 (4.9%) unmarried opposite-sex partnerships, and 35 (1.7%) same-sex married couples or partnerships. 580 households (27.3%) were one person and 246 (11.6%) had someone living alone who was 65 or older. The average household size was 2.52.  There were 1,389 families (65.5% of households); the average family size was 3.08.

The age distribution was 1,176 people (21.9%) under the age of 18, 439 people (8.2%) aged 18 to 24, 1,084 people (20.2%) aged 25 to 44, 1,741 people (32.5%) aged 45 to 64, and 925 people (17.2%) who were 65 or older.  The median age was 44.7 years. For every 100 females, there were 96.2 males.  For every 100 females age 18 and over, there were 92.7 males.

There were 2,266 housing units at an average density of ,of which 2,121 were occupied, 1,524 (71.9%) by the owners and 597 (28.1%) by renters.  The homeowner vacancy rate was 2.0%; the rental vacancy rate was 6.7%.  3,770 people (70.3% of the population) lived in owner-occupied housing units and 1,567 people (29.2%) lived in rental housing units.

References

Census-designated places in Fresno County, California
Census-designated places in California